The Colorado Department of Corrections is the principal department of the Colorado state government that operates the state prisons. It has its headquarters in the Springs Office Park in unincorporated El Paso County, Colorado, near Colorado Springs. The Colorado Department of Corrections runs 20 state-run prisons and also has been affiliated with 7 for-profit prisons in Colorado, of which the state currently contracts with 3 for-profit prisons.

Facilities

State-Run Prisons

 Arkansas Valley Correctional Facility (1007 inmate capacity) (Ordway)
 Arrowhead Correctional Center (494 inmate capacity) (Cañon City)
 Buena Vista Correctional Facility (826 inmate capacity) (Buena Vista)
 Centennial Correctional Facility (604 inmate capacity) (Cañon City) (Maximum security/mental health facility)
 Colorado Correctional Center (Camp George West) (150 inmate capacity) (Golden)
 Colorado State Penitentiary(756 inmate capacity) (Cañon City) (Maximum Security facility)
 Colorado Territorial Correctional Facility (900 inmate capacity) (Cañon City) (Medium security facility)
 Delta Correctional Center (480 inmate capacity) (Delta)
 Denver Reception & Diagnostic Center (542 inmate capacity) (Denver)
 Denver Women's Correctional Facility (900 inmate capacity) (Denver)
 Four Mile Correctional Center (499 inmate capacity) (Cañon City)
 Fremont Correctional Facility (1661 inmate capacity) (Cañon City)
 LaVista Correctional Facility (564 inmate capacity) (Pueblo)
 Limon Correctional Facility (960 inmate capacity) (Limon)
 Rifle Correctional Center (192 inmate capacity) (Rifle)
 San Carlos Correctional Facility (250 inmate capacity) (Pueblo) (mental health facility)
 Skyline Correctional Center (249 inmate capacity) (Cañon City)
 Sterling Correctional Facility (2545 inmate capacity) (Sterling)
 Trinidad Correctional Facility (500 inmate capacity) (Trinidad)
 Youthful Offender System (Pueblo)

For-profit Prisons

 Bent County Correctional Facility (1466 inmate capacity) (Las Animas). Owned by CoreCivic.
 Cheyenne Mountain Re-Entry Center (650 inmate capacity) (Colorado City) is no longer a part of the CDOC as of March 7, 2020
 Crowley County Correctional Facility (1894 inmate capacity) (Olney Springs). Owned by CoreCivic. 
 Southern Peaks (Cañon City) Youth prison owned by GEO Group.

Closed Prisons

 Fort Lyon Correctional Facility (closed 2012) (Bent County)
 High Plains Correctional Facility (Brush) (closed since 2010) (Last owned and operated by GEO Group)
 Hudson Correctional Facility (Hudson) (closed since 2013) Owned by GEO Group.
 Huerfano County Correctional Facility (Walsenburg). Closed since 2010. Owned by CoreCivic.
 Kit Carson Correctional Center (Burlington) (Private Prison; closed since 2016) Owned by CoreCivic.

Operations
All male prisoners entering the Colorado DOC system first go to the Denver Reception & Diagnostic Center (DRDC) before going to their assigned facilities; assignments are primarily determined by security level, and each facility can accommodate inmates of different security levels.

In 2012 the state of Colorado had no designated death row. All prisoners with death sentences were given classifications of "Close", the highest custody designation possible. As of 2017, all prisoners with death sentences are located at the Sterling Correctional Facility. The execution chamber is located at the Colorado State Penitentiary. By state statute, executions took place there. The death penalty was abolished in 2020.

From the 1890s to the 1990s, the Colorado death row was located at the Colorado Territorial Correctional Facility. The execution chamber was also located in this prison. In the 1990s the Colorado State Penitentiary opened. Previously state statute dictated that prisoners with death sentences were to be held at the administrative segregation facility at the Colorado State Penitentiary. In 2011 the State of Colorado moved its death row prisoners in order to settle a federal lawsuit filed by Nathan Dunlap, a death row prisoner. Dunlap had complained about the state's lack of outdoor exercise facilities at Colorado State Penitentiary. The Crowley County facility experienced two major riots involving Colorado and Washington state prisoners, the first in 1999 when operated by Correctional Services Corporation and the second on July 20, 2004, when owned and operated by the Corrections Corporation of America, and involving Wyoming inmates as well.

Fallen officers and officials
Since the establishment of the Colorado Department of Corrections, 17 officers have died while on duty, including Tom Clements.

See also

 List of law enforcement agencies in Colorado
 List of United States state correction agencies
 List of U.S. state prisons

References

External links
Colorado Department of Corrections

State law enforcement agencies of Colorado
State corrections departments of the United States
 
Lists of United States state prisons
Penal system in Colorado